Jeff Zaun (born April 2, 1971 in Orange, New Jersey) is a retired American soccer defender who is currently an assistant coach with the Rutgers University men's soccer team.  He played professionally in Major League Soccer, USISL and the USL A-League and coached one season in the USL A-League.

Playing career

Early career
Zaun played soccer at Holy Cross High School where he was a 1986 and 1987 New Jersey first team All State player.  He finished high school at Shawnee High School where he was the 1988 New Jersey Player of the Year. Shawnee won the Group 4 NJ State Championship that season and finished as the #1 ranked team in New Jersey.  In 1999, he was named by The Star-Ledger as one of the ten best New Jersey high school soccer players of the 1980s.  He was also named as one of the top ten South Jersey high school players on the All Century team by the Philadelphia Inquirer.  His 1988 Shawnee team was named the top high school team of the century by the Philadelphia Inquirer as well.

He then attended Rutgers University where he played on the men's soccer team from 1989 to 1993 where he played in two Final Fours and four NCAA tournaments. In 1990, Zaun moved from center midfield to sweeper after starting sweeper Alexi Lalas was diagnosed with an abscessed appendix.  That year, Rutgers went to the NCAA Men's Soccer Championship where it finished runner-up to UCLA.  Rutgers inducted Zaun into its Hall of Fame in 2006. Jeff Zaun was one of the best players in college but struggled with injuries if not he might have been in the world cup.

Club career
Zaun began his professional career with the expansion North Jersey Imperials of the USISL in 1994.  On February 6, 1996, the MetroStars selected Zaun in the 4th round (39th overall) of the 1996 MLS Inaugural Player Draft.  He spent three seasons in New Jersey, but saw time in only four games in 1998 due to injuries in his final season.  The MetroStars waived Zaun on February 25, 1999.  On March 1, 1999, the Chicago Fire claimed Zaun off the waiver list. After playing with the Fire for part of one season Zaun moved on to play and coach for the Lehigh Valley Steam of the USL A-League. The Steam qualified for the playoffs in their inaugural season. Zaun retired after that season and began his coaching career.

Managerial career
After graduating from Rutgers in 1994, Zaun briefly coached as an assistant with Drew University.  He returned to coaching in 1999 when he was a player-coach with the Lehigh Valley Steam of the USL A-League.  Following his retirement from playing professionally, Zaun joined the Rutgers University soccer team as an assistant coach then moved up to Associate Head Coach since 2003.

References

External links
 MetroFan profile

1971 births
Living people
American soccer coaches
American soccer players
Rutgers Scarlet Knights men's soccer players
Rutgers Scarlet Knights men's soccer coaches
USISL players
North Jersey Imperials players
New York Red Bulls players
Chicago Fire FC players
USL First Division players
Lehigh Valley Steam players
Long Island Rough Riders players
USL First Division coaches
People from Orange, New Jersey
Major League Soccer players
New York Red Bulls non-playing staff
Association football defenders
Holy Cross Academy (New Jersey) alumni
Shawnee High School (New Jersey) alumni
Soccer players from New Jersey
Sportspeople from Burlington County, New Jersey
Association football player-managers